Mel George Gaynor (born 29 May 1959) is a British drummer, best known as the longtime drummer for the rock band Simple Minds.

Biography 
Gaynor was born to a Jamaican father and an Afro-Brazilian mother. He began drumming at age 11 and had his first professional engagement at age 14.

After leaving the hard rock band Samson (in which he played alongside future Iron Maiden vocalist Bruce Dickinson), Gaynor joined Simple Minds in 1982 as a session drummer for the New Gold Dream album (as a recommendation by record producer Pete Walsh), playing on six of the nine tracks. He later joined the band permanently for the New Gold Dream tour, as a replacement for Mike Ogletree. Except for a period (1992–97) away from the band after the Real Life tour of 1991–92, he remained the Simple Minds drummer until 2017.

In addition to drumming, he is active as a songwriter and a record producer.

Gaynor considers The Rolling Stones, Led Zeppelin, Jimi Hendrix, James Brown, and the Mahavishnu Orchestra to be his main influences.

In addition to Simple Minds, he has played alongside other acts such as: Elton John, Lou Reed, Tina Turner, Meat Loaf, Samson, Mango, Kirsty MacColl, The Associates, Orange Juice, Peter Gabriel, The Pretenders, Prljavo kazalište, Gary Moore, Jackson Browne, Little Steven, Brian May, The Nolans, Goldie, Robert Palmer, Joan Armatrading and Light of the World.

In 2007, Gaynor kicked off his solo project with a version of "Play That Funky Music" and his new solo album was released at end of 2016
Gaynor's first single is the re recording of Robert Palmer's Addicted to Love released 12 September 2016.

Gaynor was also a member of Birmingham-based Muscles, a funk-oriented covers band that had minor chart success with "If It Relaxes Your Mind" and "I'm a Girlwatcher".

A new band Risk – also known as Mel Gaynor's Risk – a three piece rock band with a difference, powerful, precise and harmonious sound began recording and touring extensively from 2018.  Gaynor not only drums but also covers vocals with other band members including blues guitarist James Ford and bassist Sarit Black.

Equipment 
Gaynor has played a variety of drum sets over the years, including and currently Natal drums, and uses Remo drumheads. He has played a variety of cymbals as well, including at first Paiste during at the start of his career, but then switched to Zildjian in the early 1980s upon joining Simple Minds, which he played for much of the duration of his career.  He has also endorsed Anatolian, UFIP, and also Meinl cymbals at various other stages in his career. In 2011, Paiste announced him as an official endorser again, but at the end of 2018 he became an endorser with Italian company Vulcan Cymbals.

Gaynor plays with his signature sticks called Drum Art, and will also be coming out with a signature snare drum from the same company.

Gaynor's current list of equipment is as follows.

*Natal drums
24" BD
10" 12" 13" Rack toms
14" and 16" Floor toms
20" gong Tom
14x6.5 Metal Shell Snare
*Vulcan Cymbals
 22" Ride Etna series
 2x20" Thin Crashes Etna series
 19" Medium Crash Etna series
 19" Medium Light Crash Etna series
 22" China Etna series
 14" HiHat Etna series
*DrumArt (mel gaynor model) sticks
DrumArt snare drums
*Remo heads

Freemasonry 
Gaynor is a Freemason. He and his Simple Minds colleague Derek Forbes are members of Lodge Shalom 1600 on the Roll of The Grand Lodge of Scotland.

References

External links 
 Official website

Simple Minds members
People from Balham
1959 births
Living people
Black British rock musicians
English people of Jamaican descent
English people of Brazilian descent
English rock drummers
Freemasons of the United Grand Lodge of England
Samson (band) members